Upper Lambourn is a small village in the county of Berkshire, England. The village is situated in the civil parish of Lambourn , and is 1.2 miles (2 km) to the north-west of the village of Lambourn, just off the Lambourn to Shrivenham road. The parish is within the district of West Berkshire, close to the point where the counties of Berkshire, Oxfordshire and Wiltshire meet.

Geography
Upper Lambourn has several sites of Special Scientific Interest (SSSI) near the village, these include the famous prehistoric Seven Barrows. Other sites of SSSI near the village are Croker's Hole, Parkfarm Down and Fognam Chalk Quarry.

See also
 List of places in Berkshire
 Berkshire Downs

References

External links

 Royal Berkshire History: Upper Lambourn

Villages in Berkshire
Lambourn